Lakeshore, formerly known as Fedhaven, is an unincorporated community in Polk County, Florida, United States. The community was established in the 1960s as a retirement community for former federal employees, and was thus named Fedhaven; when the land was later sold to private ownership, its name was changed to Lakeshore. Lakeshore has a post office with ZIP code 33854; Fedhaven and Lake Wales are both considered alternate addresses for the community. In 2004, three hurricanes severely damaged Lakeshore.

References

Unincorporated communities in Polk County, Florida
Unincorporated communities in Florida